South Korean singer—songwriter Lee Chan-hyuk has written or co-written all the songs released by him and his sister, Lee Su-hyun, under the name AKMU, as well as other artists' songs.

Songs

References

Lee Chan-hyuk